The Bihar Police Department is the law enforcement agency for the state of Bihar, India, with its headquarters in Patna. It has a sanctioned strength of 111,000 personnel, and as of 2017, employs 77,000 personnel.

The present DGP of Bihar Police is R. S. Bhatti, an IPS officer of 1990 batch.

History 
There is historical evidence of the adoption of intensive policing practices in the Magadh empire more than 2,000 years ago, where the head of police was known as Dandapala. His main role was to maintain law and order in the society while implementing harsh injunctions of Arthashastra to collect taxes and suppress rebellions.

Modern policing in Bihar started in 1862 under the provisions of the Indian Police Act 1861. After Bihar was carved out as an independent province in 1912 from Bengal, the basic structure of Police was created as it exists today. It's major reorganization Several pre-eminent police officers adorned pre-independent Bihar Police Force. These include Mr. Walter Swain of Swain Beat system fame, Shri AK Sinha, the first Indian to become an IGP of any province, Shri BN Mullick, the second director of the Intelligence Bureau (IB), Khan Bahadur Azizul Haque, credited with the primary development of the famous ‘1024 pigeon holes’ cabinet system eventually named after his supervisor, Sir Edward Richard Henry.

Post independence, Bihar Police led innovative policing measures, such as the creation of a Police Welfare fund, Police Hospitals and Police Information Room (PIR) in 1952. Bihar Policemen's Association, which looks after the interests of policemen, was one of the first police welfare associations in all of India in 1967. A Police Commission was also set up in 1958, whose mandate was to bring the police closer to the people. Patna Police got its new headquarter Sardar Patel Bhavan, Bailey Road in 2018. The seven storied building with a helipad at the top is spread over almost 53,000 sqft area. Prior to this, police headquarter of Bihar Police was located at the old secretariat building since 1917.

Organizational structure
Bihar Police comes under the direct control of the Department of Home Affairs, Government of Bihar.
It has six divisions under the organizational structure, namely, Human Resource Development and Training Division (TRG), Law & Order Division (L & O), Establishment and Legal Division, Personnel and Welfare Division, Headquarter (DGP Office) and Budget Division (HQRT), and Modernization, Crime Records and Provision Division (SCRB &Mod). These are headed by four Additional Director General (ADGP), where ADGP (HQRT) has an additional charge of Welfare division, and ADGP (L & O) with that of Establishment and Legal Division. The Training division is headed by DGP (Training), while the latter five are headed by Director General (DGP).

For geographic workload distribution, the state is divided into 12 ranges, each range consisting of three to six districts. The central range (Patna and Nalanda), Gaya range (Gaya, Aurangabad, Nawada, Jehanabad and Arwal), Tirhut range (Muzaffarpur, Vaishali, Sheohar and Sitamarhi), Mithila range (Darbhanga, Madhubani and Samsatipur), and Purnia range (Purnia, Kishanganj, Katihar and Araria) are headed by IG rank officers, while other ranges are headed by DIG rank officers. Each district is commanded by a Superintendent of Police (SP), where as Patna is under a Senior Superintendent of Police.

Earlier, the state also had a zonal division into four police zones. Introduced in 1982, each zone consisted of two to four ranges, and was headed by an IG level officer. This system was abolished in 2019, and only rail police zone continues to exist.

Hierarchy

Officers

 Director General of Police (DGP)
 Additional Director General of Police (ADGP)
 Inspector General of Police (IG)
 Deputy Inspector General of Police (DIG)
 Senior Superintendent of Police (SSP) 
 Superintendent of Police (SP)
 Additional Superintendent of Police (ASP)
 Assistant Superintendent of Police (ASP) or Deputy Superintendent of Police (DSP)

Sub-ordinates
 Inspector of Police 
 Sub-Inspector of Police 
 Assistant Sub-Inspector of Police 
 Head Constable 
 Senior Constable 
 Constable

Notable Initiatives

Ladli Cops
An initiative in Community Policing for the safety of Women. The CID Branch of Bihar Police under the Leadership of Alok Raj (IPS) ADG in association with Mr. Roushan Kumar and Dr. Suman Lal founders Ladli Foundation came up with the concept of having Women Community Police to provide a safe and secure atmosphere to the inhabitants. Also to make women become familiar with Police and deeply understand the police system to invoke their taboo to interact with police station/ policemen. For this initiative, volunteer from girls studying in different colleges of Patna were identified and trained. Each of these girls were provided with ID Cards authorised by Bihar Police and are called Ladli Cops.

Equipment
All the equipment of the Bihar Police are manufactured indigenously by the Indian Ordnance Factories controlled by the Ordnance Factories Board, Ministry of Defence, Government of India.
 Wooden Baton
 Pistol Auto 9mm 1A
 9mm SAF Carbine 1A1
 7.62 mm Ishapore 2A1 Rifle
 RFI L1A1 Self-Loading Rifle
 AK 47/ AKM
 INSAS Rifle 
 Heckler and Koch MP5 (CM Security)

References

See also
 Patna Police
 State Armed Police Forces

 
State law enforcement agencies of India
1935 establishments in India
Government agencies established in 1935